The 2003 Catalan motorcycle Grand Prix was the sixth round of the 2003 MotoGP Championship. It took place on the weekend of 13–15 June 2003 at the Circuit de Catalunya located in Montmeló, Catalonia, Spain.

MotoGP classification

250 cc classification

125 cc classification

Championship standings after the race (motoGP)

Below are the standings for the top five riders and constructors after round six has concluded.

Riders' Championship standings

Constructors' Championship standings

 Note: Only the top five positions are included for both sets of standings.

References

Catalan motorcycle Grand Prix
Catalan
Catalan Motorcycle Grand Prix
motorcycle